Ants Roos (also Hans Reinhold Roos; 6 April 1885 Paide - 11 April 1962 New York, USA) was an Estonian politician. He was a member of Estonian Provincial Assembly.

References

1885 births
1962 deaths
Members of the Estonian Provincial Assembly
Estonian educators
Estonian World War II refugees
Estonian emigrants to the United States
Saint Petersburg State University alumni
University of Tartu alumni
People from Paide
Members of the Estonian National Assembly